Girolamo Scaglia (1620 – 1686) was an Italian painter of the Baroque period. He was born in Lucca, and trained there with Pietro Paolini.

References

External links

1620 births
1686 deaths
17th-century Italian painters
Italian male painters
Italian Baroque painters
Painters from Lucca